"Surrender" is a 1987 single released by British pop act Swing Out Sister from their debut album, It's Better to Travel. It was issued as the follow-up to the successful single, "Breakout". The song peaked at #7 on the UK Singles Chart in January 1987 and logged four weeks in the top ten.

Over a year after its initial release, remixes of "Surrender" reached the U.S. Billboard Hot Dance Club Play chart, peaking at #22 in May 1988.

The song features a trumpet solo performed by John Thirkell and features Drewery laughing at the beginning of the song.

Remixes
UK 7" Single
"Surrender" (7" Version)
As featured on the UK Best Of CD Album Breakout.
"Who's To Blame"

UK 12" Single
"Surrender" (Stuff Gun Mix)
Also available from the CD releases of It's Better to Travel & the Japanese CD Album Swing 3.

UK 12" Remix Single
"Surrender" (Roadrunner Mix)
As featured on the Japanese CD Album Another Non-Stop Sister.

US 12" Promo Single
"Surrender" (Pop Stand Mix)
As featured on the "US 12" Single".

Other Version
"Surrender" (Album Version)
Also available from the CD album "It's Better to Travel" & "Best of Swing Out Sister".

Charts

Weekly charts

Year-end charts

References

1987 singles
Swing Out Sister songs
Songs written by Martin Jackson
Songs written by Andy Connell
Songs written by Corinne Drewery
1987 songs
Mercury Records singles